This is a list of Cypriot football transfers for the 2018–19 winter transfer window by club. Only transfers of clubs in the Cypriot First Division and Cypriot Second Division are included.

Cypriot First Division

Note: Flags indicate national team as has been defined under FIFA eligibility rules. Players may hold more than one non-FIFA nationality.

AEK Larnaca

In:

Out:

AEL Limassol

In:

Out:

Alki Oroklini

In:

Out:

Anorthosis Famagusta

In:

Out:

Apollon Limassol

In:

Out:

APOEL

In:

Out:

Doxa Katokopias

In:

Out:

Enosis Neon Paralimni

In:

Out:

Ermis Aradippou

In:

Out:

Nea Salamis Famagusta

In:

Out:

Omonia

In:

Out:

Pafos

In:

Out:

Cypriot Second Division

AEZ Zakakiou

In:

Out:

Akritas Chlorakas

In:

Out:

Anagennisi Deryneia

In:

Out:

Aris Limassol

In:

Out:

ASIL

In:

Out:

Ayia Napa

In:

Out:

Digenis Oroklinis

In:

Out:

Ethnikos Achna

In:

Out:

Karmiotissa

In:

Out:

MEAP Nisou

In:

Out:

Olympiakos Nicosia

In:

Out:

Omonia Aradippou

In:

Out:

Onisilos Sotira 2014

In:

Out:

Othellos Athienou

In:

Out:

PAEEK

In:

Out:

THOI Lakatamia

In:

Out:

References

Cypriot
tran
Cypriot football transfers